Star Wars: Lethal Alliance is a Star Wars action adventure video game for the Nintendo DS and PlayStation Portable. It takes place between Star Wars: Episode III – Revenge of the Sith and Star Wars Episode IV: A New Hope. It was developed by Ubisoft instead of LucasArts, and was released in December 2006. Lethal Alliance was met with average to very mixed reception. GameRankings and Metacritic gave it a score of 64.18% and 61 out of 100 for the PSP version, and 64.93% and 57 out of 100 for the DS version.

Gameplay

Lethal Alliance focuses on shooting rather than lightsabers and the Force. The DS version of the game makes heavy use of the touch screen for gameplay, while the PSP version utilizes the handheld's buttons. The PSP version lets the player utilize "stealth" features such as stealth attack moves, sneaking past enemies, wearing disguises, while the DS version has an exclusive weapon called the Dual Cannon. The Dual Cannon can only be used once the player has obtained "Maximum Alliance" between Rianna and Zeeo. Once the Dual Cannon is used, it greatly drops the character's alliance bar, and must be filled to use again.

Both versions utilize Wi-Fi and local area connections for multiplayer gaming. The Sony PSP version features Twi'lek (Rianna's species) vs. Twi'lek, while the Nintendo DS features droid versus droid.

Plot 
Having escaped from enslavement by Zarien Kheev, Twi'lek Rianna Saren is such a successful mercenary opposing the Empire. Kyle Katarn of the Rebel Alliance hires her to destroy an Imperial shipment of mirkanite going through a Black Sun warehouse on Coruscant. Rianna is suddenly captured during this operation, but escapes with the help of a droid named Zeeo. Rebel leader Princess Leia later sends Rianna and Zeeo to Alderaan on a new mission to destroy an Imperial ship.

On Alderaan, Rianna and Zeeo make this way through an Imperial base, opposed by Stormtroopers and Black Sun guards. Discovering that the Empire is experimenting on these own scientists, they blow up both this ship and lab. They also do realize a final shipment is heading to Mustafar, and Leia sends them after that. Rianna and Zeeo search an Imperial mining facility on Mustafar, eventually finding and destroying the drill. Rianna finds out that Kheev is going to Tatooine, and heads there herself.

Rianna's ship is shot down over Tatooine by Boba Fett in his Slave I. Rianna and Zeeo track down Kheev, who sets a Rancor loose on them in an arena. They kill it, but are captured and brought to Despayre where the Death Star is being constructed. Escaping, they hear Kheev talking to Darth Vader about the construction on the Death Star. Donning a huge robot suit, Zheev attacks Rianna. She kills him, and she shows the Alliance that she and Zeeo have uncovered ideas to the Death Star.

Development and marketing
The game was revealed in August 2006, as was the partnership between Ubisoft and Lucasfilm. It was announced for the Sony Playstation Portable and the Nintendo DS. Bertrand Helias, Senior Producer on the game, noted that the team closely with LucasArts to define the game and the story. "They have been excellent collaborative partners, and have also given us the freedom to implement the game mechanics we wanted to develop." It was released initially on December 7, 2006 for the Sony Playstation Portable. The Nintendo DS version was released a week later on December 14, 2006.

Reception

Lethal Alliance was met with average to very mixed reception.  GameRankings and Metacritic gave it a score of 64.18% and 61 out of 100 for the PSP version, and 64.93% and 57 out of 100 for the DS version.

References

External links
 
 

2006 video games
Ubisoft games
Nintendo DS games
PlayStation Portable games
Lethal Alliance
Third-person shooters
Video games developed in Canada
Video games featuring female protagonists